Hlib Piskunov (born 25 November 1998) is a Ukrainian male hammer thrower, who won an individual gold medal at the Youth World Championships.

References

External links

 

1998 births
Living people
People from Nova Kakhovka
Ukrainian male hammer throwers
Athletes (track and field) at the 2014 Summer Youth Olympics
Youth Olympic gold medalists for Ukraine
Youth Olympic gold medalists in athletics (track and field)
Athletes (track and field) at the 2020 Summer Olympics
Olympic athletes of Ukraine
Sportspeople from Kherson Oblast
21st-century Ukrainian people